United States v. Shabani, 513 U.S. 10 (1994), was a case in which the Supreme Court of the United States clarified standards for conspiracy liability under a federal drug conspiracy statute. In a unanimous opinion written by Justice Sandra Day O'Connor, the Court held that government prosecutors need not prove evidence of an overt act in furtherance of the conspiracy when prosecuting individuals under the drug conspiracy statute codified at 21 U.S.C. § 846. Justice O'Connor wrote that Congress intended to "adopt the common law definition" of conspiracy for section 846, which did not require an overt act as a precondition of liability. Justice O'Connor's opinion also compared the drug conspiracy statute to the general conspiracy statute, which requires that a conspirator commit an overt act in furtherance of the conspiracy, noting that "[i]n light of this additional element in the general conspiracy statute, Congress' silence in § 846 speaks volumes."

See also
actus reus
 List of United States Supreme Court cases, volume 513
 List of United States Supreme Court cases
 Lists of United States Supreme Court cases by volume
 List of United States Supreme Court cases by the Rehnquist Court

References

External links
 

1994 in United States case law
United States Supreme Court cases of the Rehnquist Court
Conspiracy (criminal)
United States Supreme Court cases